Kota Kinabalu Bypass, comprising Jalan Mat Salleh, Jalan Tunku Abdul Rahman and Jalan KK Bypass, is a major highway in Kota Kinabalu city, Sabah, Malaysia. The highway was built at the original site of the railway line linking Tanjung Aru railway station until Kota Kinabalu Port.

List of interchanges 

Highways in Malaysia